The 2021 European Beach Handball Championship was held in Varna, Bulgaria from 13 to 18 July 2021. The tournament was held at Varna's South Beach area, where four courts were. All results, schedules and news regarding the EHF Beach Handball EURO can be found at beacheuro.eurohandball.com.

Format 
Men's competition starts in the preliminary round with eighteen teams, split into two groups of five and two groups of four. Top three teams of each group advances to the Main round where they are split into two groups of six, while fourth and fifth teams are sent to the Consolation round in two groups of three. Top four teams in each group of the Main round advances to quarterfinals followed by semi finals and finals. Teams eliminated in the Main round continues to play against teams from the Consolation round. Matches are played for all of eighteen places available. Groups in the preliminary round are playing a round-robin, while in the Main round they are playing only against teams they haven't play before, as the results of preliminary round are brought forward into the Main round only in matches of teams that have advanced.

Women's competition starts in the preliminary round with seventeen teams, split into one group of five and three groups of four. Top three teams of each group advances to the Main round where they are split into two groups of six, while fourth and fifth teams are sent to the Consolation round in single groups of five. Top four teams in each group of the Main round advances to quarterfinals followed by semi finals and finals. Teams eliminated in the Main round continues to play against each other. Matches are played for all of seventeen places available. Groups in the preliminary round are playing a round-robin, while in the Main round they are playing only against teams they haven't play before, as the results of preliminary round are brought forward into the Main round only in matches of teams that have advanced.

Matches were played in sets, the team that wins two sets is the winner of a match. When teams are equal in points the head-to-head result is decisive.

Men

Preliminary round

Group A

Group B

Group C

Group D

Main round

Group I

Group II

Consolation round

Group III

Group IV

Placement round

Final standings

Women

Preliminary round

Group A

Group B

Group C

Group D

Main round

Group I

Group II

Consolation round

Group III

Placement round

Final standings

Broadcasting 
List of broadcasters and territories:

Controversies 
After the European Handball Federation (EHF) fined the Norwegian women's team for wearing shorts like the men's team instead of the required bikini bottom, the EHF said it would donate the amount paid by the Norwegian team "to a major international sports foundation which supports equality for women and girls in sports." American singer Pink said she offered to pay the fine.

External links 
 Men's tournament
 Women's tournament

References 

European Beach Handball Championship
Beach Handball Championship
Beach Handball Championship
European Beach Handball Championship
European Beach Handball Championship
Clothing controversies